XEEW-FM (97.7 MHz) is a radio station in Matamoros, Tamaulipas serving the area Brownsville, Texas. It carries the Los 40 format from Radiopolis.

References

External links
 
 los40.com.mx
 raiostationworld.com; Radio stations in the Rio Grande Valley
 Los 40 97.7fm Facebook

Spanish-language radio stations
Radio stations in Matamoros, Tamaulipas